The Via Foundation, Nadace Via, is a charitable foundation located in Prague, Czech Republic.

The Via Foundation provides small grants and expertise to non-profit community initiatives in the Czech Republic. Where 50 years of totalitarian government dampened people's initiative, the Via Foundation now supports peoples' efforts to improve their communities through a variety of programs and activities.

Mission
The Via Foundation supports and strengthens public participation in the development of a democratic society in the Czech Republic.

This includes:
  Supporting the growth of nonprofit organizations.
 Developing the culture of philanthropy in the Czech Republic.
 Supporting the cooperation between non-profit organizations, local authorities, and local businesses.

History
In 1997, the Via Foundation was created as the indigenous successor to the Foundation for a Civil Society. Since then Via has supported over 1650 community projects in over 260 cities, towns and villages.

The name "Via" (Latin for "path") was chosen to evoke the image of a common path towards a vibrant, active, and democratic society.

Via Bona Award for Philanthropy
2007 marks the 10th year of the Via Foundation’s annual Via Bona Award for Philanthropy. The award acknowledges exemplary philanthropy of companies and individuals who have a history of strong support of the work of non-profit organizations in the Czech Republic.

The Via Bona awards are presented each September at a ceremony held at the residence of the United States Ambassador to the Czech Republic in Prague. The Via Bona Award is given to those who serve as an example to others through their material and financial support, as well as their willingness to tread untried paths. These donors move the Czech Republic ever closer to the renewal of a healthy tradition of giving and philanthropy.

The Via Bona Awards are made possible with the support of Citibank and the Citigroup Foundation and in partnership with the Foundation for a Civil Society.

*  2007 Via Bona Awards Press Release PDF

*  2006 Via Bona Awards Press Release PDF

*  2005 Via Bona Awards Press Release

List of Past Via Bona Award Winners

Partnership with CEE Trust
The Trust for Civil Society in Central & Eastern Europe ("CEE Trust") was launched in January 2001 as an independent public charity organization with endowment support from a group of private grant-making foundations including Atlantic Philanthropies, the Charles Stewart Mott Foundation, the Ford Foundation, the German Marshall Fund of the United States, the Open Society Institute, the Pfizer Foundation, and the Rockefeller Brothers Fund.

In the period 2001-2005, the CEE Trust had three mutually reinforcing objectives:

 To support legal, fiscal and political environments in which civil societies can flourish;
 To strengthen the nonprofit sectors in the target countries through institutional capacity building; and
 To support the long-term financial sustainability of nonprofit organizations.

The CEE Trust Board of Directors selected the Via Foundation as its regional partner and allocated US$3,000,000 to the program in the Czech Republic for a three-year period between 2002-2005.

TechSoup Česká republika
On December 12, 2010, the Via Foundation and Charter 77 jointly launched partnership with the US-based nonprofit organization, TechSoup.  The project aims to provide technology to qualified Czech nonprofit and civic organizations through the website www.techsoup.cz.

References

Video
 The Via Foundation
 The Via Foundation's 10th Anniversary Event featuring Madeleine K. Albright - Via Executive Director Jiří Bárta
 The Via Foundation's 10th Anniversary Event featuring Madeleine K. Albright - Secretary Madeleine K. Albright (Part 1)

Further reading
Helping Hands September, 2006 Prague Post article about the Via Foundation's Via Bona Award for Philanthropy by  Kathleen Kralowec.
 Giving Back to Their Homelands May 16, 2002  Chronicle of Philanthropy article about "diaspora giving" by Stephen G. Greene.
 Transparency: AmCham Speakers' Series Breakfast United States Ambassador Richard W. Graber's Remarks at the American Chamber of Commerce (Prague) Speakers' Series Breakfast February 14, 2007.
  Community Philanthropy Initiative Czech Republic Overview  European Foundation Center report on community foundations in the Czech Republic.
 "Novou náves nám závidějí lidé ze širokého okolí" February 8, 2007  Moderní obec article about a Via Foundation-supported project in Vlkov, Czech Republic by Helena Rezková (in Czech).
 "Lidé z ghetta si sami opravují dům" January 16, 2007 Mladá fronta DNES article about one community development project sponsored by the Via Foundation in Dobra Voda, Czech Republic by Radek Duchoň (in Czech).

External links
 The Via Foundation in English
 The Via Foundation's Facebook page
 Nadace Via in Czech
 Friends of Via Nadace Via - The Via Foundation's USA - based partner organization
  Central and Eastern European Trust
  Foundation for a Civil Society
 The Via Foundation  Idealist.org profile of the Via Foundation

Foundations based in the Czech Republic
Non-profit organizations based in the Czech Republic